Ahmed Abdel Aal (born September 17, 1989) is an Egyptian professional footballer who plays as a defensive midfielder for the Egyptian club Al Nasr. Abdel Aal joined Ghazl El Mahalla in 2015 from El Raja SC and signed a three-year contract for the club. But after only one season, El Mahalla decided to left off the player after being relegated to second division.

References

External links
Ahmed Abdel Aal at KOOORA.com

1989 births
Living people
Egyptian footballers
Association football midfielders